Endolepiotula is a fungal genus in the family Agaricaceae. This is a monotypic genus, containing the single secotioid species Endolepiotula ruizlealii. This fungus was found in Mendoza Province, Argentina, growing in sandy soil in somewhat dry environment after rainfall.

See also
 List of Agaricales genera
 List of Agaricaceae genera

References

Agaricaceae
Fungi of South America
Monotypic Agaricales genera
Secotioid fungi
Taxa named by Rolf Singer